Brunete is a town located on the outskirts of Madrid, Spain with a population of 10,730 people.

History

There was no military garrison in Brunete and there was no rebel attempt to seize the city during the coup of July 1936. Brunete remained in the deep rear of the front, in the summer established in Sierra de Guadarrama, some 20 km to the north. The Nationalist 7. Division approached the city in mid-October 1936, and on October 18 the Republican government declared Brunete within zona de guerra. There was no major fighting reported before on November 1, 1936 the Nationalist troops seized Brunete.

In the summer of 1937 the Republican general staff prepared a diversionary offensive; it was intended to make Franco shift some of his troops from Cantabria and assist the defenders of Santander. The attack commenced in very late hours of July 5, and on the evening of July 6 Brunete was re-taken by the Republicans; they claimed to have taken 80 prisoners. The Nationalists re-grouped and indeed moved some units from the Northern Front. Following some 2 weeks of fierce fighting, Brunete was again seized by the rebels on July 24, 1937. For the remainder of the war the city remained under the Nationalist control in the rear of the frontline, some 10 km from combat positions at the outskirts of Madrid.

In 2013 the local council launched a system to tackle a perceived dog excrement problem, which involved identifying offending dogs and posting the excrement to the homes of their owners. Initial results showed that the amount of dog faeces in the town reduced by 70 per cent.

Geography

See also
 Battle of Brunete
 Brunete Armoured Division

References

External links

Satellite images of Brunete

Municipalities in the Community of Madrid